Alfred Rappaport may refer to:

 Alfred Rappaport (diplomat) (1868–1946), Austrian diplomat
 Alfred Rappaport (economist) (born 1932), American economist